Bagratashen is a village in the Noyemberyan Municipality of the Tavush Province of Armenia. The village is located near the border to Georgia, with the Georgian village of Sadakhlo being located on the other side of the border.

Etymology 
The village was named in honor of Bagrat Vardanian (1894-1971), who received the Hero of Socialist Labour title in the Soviet Union.

References

External links 

Populated places in Tavush Province